Haruka Minami can refer to:
A character from Minami-ke
The penname of Kazuka Minami